James Owens (born May 1, 1950) is an American former professional basketball player. He played in the National Basketball Association for the Phoenix Suns during the 1973–74 and 1974–75 seasons. Owens was selected by the Suns in the 1973 NBA draft as the 128th overall pick. For his career he averaged 3.1 points per game in 58 games played.

References

1950 births
Living people
American men's basketball players
Arizona State Sun Devils men's basketball players
Basketball players from Los Angeles
Phoenix Suns draft picks
Phoenix Suns players
Small forwards